Major Marc Dauphin, MSM, CD (born 6 February 1960) is a Canadian retired military doctor specialized in emergency medicine. He was based in Kandahar, Afghanistan, where he was in charge of  the Role 3 Multinational Hospital at Kandahar Airfield. Major Dauphin was the basis for the character of Colonel Xavier Marks in the Canadian TV series Combat Hospital.

Life and career 
Dauphin was born in Montreal and attended high school at Le Petit Séminaire de Québec (now Le Collège François de Laval), then studied medicine at Université Laval in Quebec City.

As a result of the trauma of serving in a war zone, he suffered from post-traumatic stress disorder and contemplated suicide.

Dauphin wrote Combat Doctor about his experiences in Afghanistan.

References

1960 births
Canadian military personnel
Canadian military doctors
Conservative Party of Canada candidates for the Canadian House of Commons
Living people
People from Montreal
Quebec candidates for Member of Parliament